Grenadier Island Schoolhouse, also known as School No. 16, is a historic one-room school building located on Grenadier Island, Cape Vincent, Jefferson County, New York.  It was built about 1879, and is a one-story, two bay by two bay, frame building on a limestone foundation. The building includes a small entrance vestibule and open main classroom space.  Also on the property is a contributing original outhouse.  It operated until 1942.

It was added to the National Register of Historic Places in 2012.

References

One-room schoolhouses in New York (state)
School buildings on the National Register of Historic Places in New York (state)
School buildings completed in 1879
Schools in Jefferson County, New York
National Register of Historic Places in Jefferson County, New York